World Watch, or WorldWatch, is a programming block on SBS and SBS Viceland, and a standalone television channel in Australia, that carries news bulletins from countries around the world. The World Watch service gives viewers the opportunity to see news bulletins in their native language. The majority of these bulletins are produced by public or state broadcasters.

History
The WorldWatch program began on 23 August 1993 with news bulletins from the People's Republic of China, the United States, Germany and Russia.

In June 2002, SBS launched the SBS World News Channel, providing repeats of aired bulletins on SBS in addition to updated bulletins.

In October 2003, Filipino, Vietnamese and Arabic were added to the World Watch schedule. However, the Vietnamese service was controversial as the broadcaster chosen was the government-controlled VTV4, which was seen as deeply offensive and seen as propaganda to many Vietnamese Australians who fled after the Vietnam War. It was quickly removed on 17 October.

In 2009, SBS replaced the World News Channel with SBS 2 (now SBS Viceland), and the bulletins also moved to the new channel under the "World Watch" banner. Bulletins air from 6:00am to 6:00pm, whereas SBS airs the bulletins between 5:00am and 1:30pm.

In 2010, SBS added three new languages: Portuguese, Urdu and Hindi.

In October 2015, SBS added eleven new bulletins to the World Watch schedule: African English, Armenian, Bengali, Bosnian, Nepali, Punjabi, Romanian, Sinhalese, Somali, Tamil and Thai; and created an English language line-up on SBS, which moved the Cantonese, Japanese, Korean and Mandarin bulletins from SBS to SBS 2.

In early 2021, SBS suspended its Chinese-sourced Mandarin and English bulletins from CCTV and CGTN in response to a complaint from a human rights group that the channels were broadcasting "forced confessions." In the bulletin's 6:30am timeslot airs an English-language Deutsche-Welle bulletin instead.

Usually, before a WorldWatch bulletin, an intro animation revealing the city and country of origin of the bulletin, sometimes also including the full title of the bulletin, is shown, as well as a disclaimer, which, following the previously mentioned backlash over the choice of Vietnamese news broadcasts, explains that the bulletin may not reflect the network's standards and may include distressing content.

After a bulletin ends, information about other airtimes for that bulletin and airtimes for the bulletin language's SBS Radio program are shown, explained by a voiceover in the bulletin's native language. If the bulletin is in English, then no relevant information as mentioned is shown.

In early 2022, SBS announced that they are relocating most of non-English news bulletins from the World Watch programming block into their newly launched in-house news channel SBS WorldWatch, which launched on 23 May 2022, along with SBS-produced local news in both Arabic and Mandarin (which the latter two was premiered early on SBS On Demand since earlier that year), as both SBS and SBS Viceland are making some space for special events such as live sports that has been interrupt World Watch news bulletins (see below), although English news bulletins from international news channels (not to be confused with SBS-produced SBS World News) are still available to watch in the morning and midday.

Bulletins
In determining the World Watch schedule, the policy of SBS has been to match the selection of news programs with the ethnic composition of the Australian population. The World Watch schedule includes news bulletins from Armenia, Bangladesh, Bosnia and Herzegovina, Canada, Croatia, France, Fiji, Germany, Greece, Hong Kong, Hungary, India, Indonesia, Italy, Japan, Macedonia, Malta, Nepal, the Netherlands, New Zealand, Pakistan, the Philippines, Poland, Portugal, Qatar, Romania, Serbia, Spain, Somalia, South Korea, Sri Lanka, Thailand, Turkey, Ukraine, the United Kingdom, and the United States.

The programs are usually broadcast unedited, and between the times of 2:30 am and mid-afternoon. However, SBS does edit programs under "exceptional circumstances" where it breaches broadcasting regulations and its Codes of Practices. In addition, commercials and sponsorship messages are edited out, while the end of the program will also be cut out when the program runs overtime in its timeslot. Also, due to SBS broadcast rights to certain sporting events, particular bulletins can be axed from schedule to allow airtime for the sporting events. Very rarely does SBS ever fill in broadcast gaps with WorldWatch bulletins.

In case that SBS does not receive the program on time, the program's timeslot would be filled with either its WeatherWatch program or English-language programming from DW-TV in Germany.

Current bulletins

English News bulletins

Non-English News bulletins on SBS WorldWatch

Currently suspended

Former bulletins

Notes

References

External links 
 Official Site for SBS World News
 World Watch on SBS World News Australia

Australian television news shows
Television programming blocks in Australia
Special Broadcasting Service original programming
1993 Australian television series debuts
2000s Australian television series
2010s Australian television series